The Bosnia and Herzegovina men's national basketball team (Bosnian: Košarkaška reprezentacija Bosne i Hercegovine / Кошаркашка репрезентација Босне и Херцеговине) represents Bosnia and Herzegovina in international basketball competitions, and is governed by the Basketball Federation of Bosnia and Herzegovina. Until 1992, Bosnian basketballers played for Yugoslavia.

Bosnia and Herzegovina reached their first international tournament at the EuroBasket in 1993. They have competed nine times at the event overall. The team has yet to qualify on the global level to play at the FIBA World Cup.

History
Until 1992, Bosnia and Herzegovina was a part of Yugoslavia, which meant players born in Bosnia and Herzegovina played for the Yugoslavia national team. Between 1947 and 1992, the following Bosnia-born players were selected to play for the Yugoslavia national team at the biggest competitions (Olympics, World Cup, and EuroBasket) at least once: Mirza Delibašić, Dražen Dalipagić, Predrag Danilović, Zoran Savić, Ratko Radovanović, Borislav Stanković, Milan Bjegojević, Dragiša Vučinić, Sabit Hadžić, Emir Mutapčić, and Mario Primorac. During this time, Bosnia and Herzegovina's capital city, Sarajevo, was one of five locations where games were played during the 1970 FIBA World Cup; where Yugoslavia finished in first place, the team's first gold medal at the FIBA World Cup.

After gaining its independence from Yugoslavia, Bosnia and Herzegovina qualified to the EuroBasket for the first time in 1993. Entering the tournament, Bosnia and Herzegovina earned their first ever EuroBasket victory in their final Group A match against Sweden. The team would go on to make it to the quarter-finals before losing to the eventual bronze medalists Croatia, which sent the team into the classification phase to finish out the competition.

After a positive showing for the national team in their first EuroBasket appearance, they would fail to qualify for the tournament in 1995. However, Bosnia and Herzegovina would turn around to qualify for the continental showpiece five consecutive times (1997, 1999, 2001, 2003, 2005). Although after that stretch for the national team, they would only qualify for the Euros three times after 2005 until 2015. Heading toward qualification for EuroBasket 2017, Bosnia and Herzegovina came up short in their attempt to qualify to the EuroBasket for the first time since 2009.

For qualification to reach the 2019 FIBA World Cup, Bosnia and Herzegovina first went through European Pre-Qualifiers, where the team won four out of their six matches (4–2) to advance. Entering the first round of the qualifiers, the national team earned a tough win at home against Russia 81–76. After the win, Bosnia and Herzegovina would pull out one more victory during the rest of the first round of qualifying to position itself to advance. In the second and final round of 2019 World Cup qualifying, the team lost its first five matches by single digits before defeating Bulgaria. However, the five crucial losses ultimately eliminated the team from clinching qualification.

In 2022, Bosnia and Herzegovina were set to play in the EuroBasket 2022 but were in danger on missing out on the tournament due to a lack of funds, just weeks before the start. Eventually, the federation received 150,000 convertible marks in financial aid from the Bosnian government, to ensure participation in the tournament.

Competitive record

FIBA World Cup

Olympic Games

EuroBasket

Recent results and forthcoming fixtures

2021

2022

2023

Team

Current roster
Roster for the 2023 FIBA World Cup Qualifiers matches on 23 and 26 February 2023 against Montenegro and Hungary.

Depth chart

Notable players
Current notable players from Bosnia and Herzegovina:

Records
Players in bold are still active.

Head coach history

Past rosters
1993 EuroBasket: finished 8th among 16 teams

4 Samir Selešković, 5 Gordan Firić, 6 Adis Bećiragić, 8 Senad Begović, 9 Ilijas Masnić, 10 Mario Primorac, 11 Samir Avdić,12 Emir Mutapčić, 13 Emir Halimić, 14 Sabahudin Bilalović (Coach:  Ibrahim Krehić)

1997 EuroBasket: finished 15th among 16 teams

4 Nenad Marković, 5 Gordan Firić, 6 Adis Bećiragić, 7 Samir Lerić, 8 Azur Korlatović, 9 Sejo Bukva, 10 Samir Selešković,11 Samir Avdić, 12 Elvir Ovčina, 13 Dževad Alihodžić, 14 Adnan Hodžić, 15 Haris Mujezinović (Coach:  Sabit Hadžić)

1999 EuroBasket: finished 15th among 16 teams

4 Nenad Marković, 5 Gordan Firić, 6 Adis Bećiragić, 7 Samir Lerić, 8 Ivan Opačak, 9 Jasmin Hukić, 10 Damir Mirković, 11 Tarik Valjevac,12 Dževad Alihodžić, 13 Elvir Ovčina, 15 Haris Mujezinović (Coach:  Sabit Hadžić)

2001 EuroBasket: finished 13th among 16 teams

4 Nenad Marković, 5 Gordan Firić, 6 Goran Terzić, 7 Samir Lerić, 8 Ivan Opačak, 9 Jasmin Hukić, 10 Siniša Kovačević, 11 Bariša Krasić,12 Damir Mršić, 13 Ramiz Suljanović, 14 Elvir Ovčina, 15 Haris Mujezinović (Coach:  Sabit Hadžić)

2003 EuroBasket: finished 15th among 16 teams

4 Terrel Castle, 5 Elvir Ovčina, 6 Damir Krupalija, 7 Samir Lerić, 8 Želimir Stevanović, 9 Jasmin Hukić, 10 Siniša Kovačević,11 Bariša Krasić, 12 Damir Mršić, 13 Kenan Bajramović, 14 Mirza Teletović, 15 Haris Mujezinović (Coach:  Draško Prodanović)

2005 EuroBasket: finished 15th among 16 teams

4 Vedran Princ, 5 Elvir Ovčina, 6 Mirza Teletović, 7 Samir Lerić, 8 Edin Bavčić, 9 Henry Domercant, 10 Siniša Kovačević,11 Mujo Tuljković, 12 Damir Mršić, 13 Jasmin Hukić, 14 Aleksandar Radojević, 15 Kenan Bajramović (Coach:  Mensur Bajramović)

2011 EuroBasket: finished 19th among 24 teams

4 Nemanja Gordić, 5 Aleksej Nešović, 6 Ermin Jazvin, 7 Goran Ikonić, 8 Milan Milošević, 9 Edin Bavčić, 10 Saša Vasiljević,11 Elmedin Kikanović, 12 Mirza Teletović, 13 Henry Domercant, 14 Nihad Đedović, 15 Kenan Bajramović (Coach:  Sabit Hadžić)

2013 EuroBasket: finished 12th among 24 teams

4 Muhamed Pašalić, 5 Ante Mašić, 6 Andrija Stipanović, 7 Marko Šutalo, 8 Zack Wright, 9 Edin Bavčić, 10 Nemanja Gordić,11 Elmedin Kikanović, 12 Mirza Teletović, 13 Dalibor Peršić, 14 Nihad Đedović, 15 Nedžad Sinanović (Coach:  Aleksandar Petrović)

2015 EuroBasket: finished 23rd among 24 teams

4 Muhamed Pašalić, 5 Nedim Buza, 6 Andrija Stipanović, 7 Marko Šutalo, 9 Edin Bavčić, 10 Nemanja Gordić, 11 Elmedin Kikanović (C),13 Dalibor Peršić, 15 Milan Milošević, 20 Alex Renfroe, 23 Adin Vrabac, 30 Draško Albijanić (Coach:  Duško Ivanović)

2022 EuroBasket: finished 18th among 24 teams

0 Jusuf Nurkić, 2 John Roberson, 5 Edin Atić, 7 Miralem Halilović (C), 9 Amar Gegić, 11 Kenan Kamenjaš, 12 Sani Čampara,13 Džanan Musa, 15 Ajdin Penava, 17 Aleksandar Lazić, 22 Emir Sulejmanović, 27 Adin Vrabac (Coach:  Adis Bećiragić)

Kit

See also

Sport in Bosnia and Herzegovina
Bosnia and Herzegovina women's national basketball team
Bosnia and Herzegovina men's national under-20 basketball team
Bosnia and Herzegovina men's national under-18 and under-19 basketball team
Bosnia and Herzegovina men's national under-16 and under-17 basketball team

Notes

References

External links
 (in Bosnian)
Bosnia and Herzegovina FIBA profile 
Bosnia and Herzegovina National Team – Men at Eurobasket.com
Bosnia and Herzegovina Basketball Records at FIBA Archive

 
 
Men's national basketball teams